China National Highway 353 (G353) runs from Ningde, Fujian to Fugong County, Yunnan.

Route and distance

References 

353
Transport in Fujian
Transport in Jiangxi
Transport in Hunan
Transport in Hubei
Transport in Chongqing
Transport in Sichuan
Transport in Yunnan